Penelope Moor (born 7 July 1951) is a British former professional tennis player.

A left-handed player from Exeter, Moor competed on the professional tour in the 1960s and 1970s. She made the singles third round of the 1973 Wimbledon Championships and had a best world ranking of 98.

In 1980 she moved to North Carolina, where she remained a longtime resident.

References

External links
 
 

1951 births
Living people
British female tennis players
English female tennis players
Tennis people from Devon
Sportspeople from Exeter